Island flycatcher may refer to several species of birds:

 Turquoise flycatcher, found in Indonesia and the Philippines
 Velvet flycatcher, endemic to Mussau Island in the Bismarck Archipelago

Birds by common name